The Six Gallery reading (also known as the Gallery Six reading or Six Angels in the Same Performance) was an important poetry event that took place on Friday, October 7, 1955,  at 3119 Fillmore Street in San Francisco.

History 
Conceived by Wally Hedrick, this event was the first important public manifestation of the Beat Generation and helped to herald the West Coast literary revolution that continued the San Francisco Renaissance. Peter Forakis created the poster for the reading.

At the reading, five talented young poets—Allen Ginsberg, Philip Lamantia, Michael McClure, Gary Snyder, and Philip Whalen—who until then were known mainly within a close company of friends and other writers (such as Lionel Trilling and William Carlos Williams), presented some of their latest works. They were introduced by Kenneth Rexroth, a San Francisco poet of an older generation, who was a kind of literary father-figure for the younger poets and had helped to establish their burgeoning community through personal introductions at his weekly salon.

Lamantia read poems by his dead friend John Hoffman. McClure read "Point Lobos Animism" and "For the Death of 100 Whales"; Snyder, "A Berry Feast"; and Whalen, "Plus Ca Change". Most famously, it was at this reading that Allen Ginsberg first presented his poem Howl.

Hedrick, a painter and veteran of the Korean War, approached Ginsberg in the summer of 1955 and asked him to organize a poetry reading at the Six Gallery. At first, Ginsberg refused. But once he'd written a rough draft of Howl, he changed his "fucking mind", as he put it. The large and excited audience included a drunken Jack Kerouac, who refused to read his own work but cheered the other poets on, shouting "Yeah! Go! Go!" during their performances. Still, Kerouac was able to recall much of what occurred at the reading, and wrote an account that he included in his novel The Dharma Bums.

Also in attendance was Lawrence Ferlinghetti, who telegrammed Ginsberg the following day offering to publish his work. Neal Cassady passed around the wine jug and a collection plate. Also there was Ann Charters, then a UC Berkeley college student. It was on this night that Charters first met Kerouac, the subject of her best known work, the biography Kerouac (1973).

The Six Gallery, founded by Hedrick, Deborah Remington, John Ryan the poet, Jack Spicer the poet, Hayward King, and David Simpson, was previously known as the King Ubu Gallery – a reference to Ubu Roi – which was founded by artist Jess Collins in 1952. Before its association with art and poetry, it was an auto repair shop. In 1995, literary pilgrim Tony Willard wrote of the location, "3119 Fillmore stands in the middle of block's west side, canary yellow with royal blue awnings, black flower boxes full of exuberant geraniums at the second-story windows. It houses a store called Silkroute International, whose rugs and pillows spill onto the sidewalk."  The Gallery's 3119 address no longer exists, but a podium and plaque commemorating the 50th anniversary of the reading of "Howl" stand on the sidewalk in front of a restaurant at 3115 Fillmore. The black flower boxes are still there, without exuberant geraniums.

Footnotes

External links 
Drunk Poetry Fans and the First Reading of ‘Howl’", Time magazine, October 7, 2015.
 Literary Kicks: Six Gallery
 About "Howl" in Performance
 Smithsonian Archives of American Art: Oral history interview with Wally Hedrick, 1974 June 10–24

Beat Generation
Jack Kerouac
1955 in the United States
History of San Francisco